Eikefjord is a former municipality in the Sunnfjord district in the old Sogn og Fjordane county, Norway. The  municipality existed from 1923 until 1964 when it joined  Flora Municipality (now part of Kinn Municipality in Vestland county). The administrative center of the former municipality was the village of Eikefjord, where Eikefjord Church is located. The lake Endestadvatnet was part of the municipality. The municipality encompassed the immediate area around the village of Eikefjord and to the east and south of the village.

Name
The municipality was named after the old Eikefjord farm since the Eikefjord Church was located there.  The farm is named after the nearby fjord which is located nearby.  The fjord name comes from the Old Norse word eiki which means oak wood.

History
The parish of Eikefjord was established as a municipality on 1 January 1923 when the large municipality of Kinn was divided into three: Kinn (population: 2,508) in the west, Bru (population: 1,560) in the centre, and Eikefjord (population: 929) in the east.

During the 1960s, there were many municipal mergers across Norway due to the work of the Schei Committee. On 1 January 1964, Eikefjord Municipality (population: 919) was merged with the town of Florø (population: 2,040), Kinn Municipality (population: 3,567), the parts of Bru Municipality located north of the Førdefjorden (population: 1,155), the Husefest and Breivik areas of Bremanger Municipality (population: 9), and the Steindal area of Vevring Municipality (population: 25) were combined to form the newly created Flora Municipality.

Government

Municipal council
The municipal council  of Eikefjord was made up of 13 representatives that were elected to four year terms.  The party breakdown of the final municipal council was as follows:

See also
List of former municipalities of Norway

References

External links

Weather information in Eikefjord 

Kinn
Former municipalities of Norway
1923 establishments in Norway
1964 disestablishments in Norway